Karl Höfer also Hoefer; (29 December 1862 in Pleß – 12 May 1939 in Würzburg) was a German general. During World War I he became known as the Held vom Kemmelberge
(hero of Kemmel hill) after his division had captured the Kemmelberg during the Fourth Battle of Flanders.

Retired, as "Generalleutnant a. D.", Höfer defended German Upper Silesia against Polish insurgents in the Silesian Uprisings in 1921. The Freikorps leaders had agreed upon Höfer as commander; he led them to success in the Battle of Annaberg. In the international press, he was referred to as "General Hoefer" or "Teuton Commander Hoefer".

Decorations 
 Pour le Mérite with Oak Leaves
 Pour le Merite on July 23, 1916
 Oak Leaves on April 14, 1918 (86th award)

Works 
 Karl Hoefer: Oberschlesien in der Aufstandszeit, 1918-1921: Erinnerungen und Dokumente, published by E.S. Mittler & Sohn, 1938, 376 pages
reviewed by H. F. P. Percival, International Affairs, Vol. 17, No. 6 (Nov. - Dec., 1938), pp. 853–854 (review consists of 2 pages)

Notes

1862 births
1939 deaths
People from Pszczyna
20th-century Freikorps personnel
German Army generals of World War I
Lieutenant generals of the Reichswehr
Major generals of Prussia
Recipients of the Pour le Mérite (military class)